Churachandpur (Meitei pronunciation: /tʃʊraːˌtʃaːnɗpʊr/) is the district headquarter of the Churachandpur District in the Indian state of Manipur. It is named after the Meitei King Churachand Singh, the Maharaja of Manipur Kingdom.

It must be clearly noted that Churachandpur is not the name of a place or locality. It is only the name of a district in Manipur. Not to be confused with Lamka Town  where these populations reside.

Literacy rate
Churachandpur district boasts a high literacy rate of 74.67% (2001 Census), above the state literacy average of 68.87% and the Indian average of 64%.

See also 
 List of populated places in Churachandpur district

Notes

References 

 
Cities and towns in Churachandpur district